Landvegur or Route 26 is a national road in Southern Region. It runs from the ring road near Hella through the Landssveit area to the intersection of Þjórsárdalsvegur. From there it is called Sprengisandsleið, although this name is also refers to Route F26, which starts at the end of Route 26 near Þórisvatn.

See also
Sprengisandsleið

References

Roads in Iceland